This is a list of Mexico's ambassadors to Serbia (and Yugoslavia).

 Alfonso de Rosenzweig Díaz, 1946–1947
 Francisco del Río y Cañedo, 1947–1950
 Víctor Fernández Manero, 1950–1951
 Cristóbal Guzmán Cárdenas, 1951–1952
 Eduardo Morillo Safa Briones, 1953–1954
 Federico Amaya Rodríguez, 1955–1957
 Vicente L. Benéitez, 1958–1961
 Delfín Sánchez Juárez Lazo, 1961–1965
 Natalio Vázquez Pallares, 1965–1968
 Ramón Ruiz Vasconcelos, 1968–1973
 Emilio Calderón Puig, 1976–1977
 Jorge Eduardo Navarrete López, 1977–1978
 Omar Martínez Legorreta, 1979–1981
 Javier Wimer Zambrano, 1981–1982
 Francisco López Cámara, 1983–1987
 Henrique González Casanova del Valle, 1987–1990
 Agustín García López Santaolalla, 1991–1992
 Carlos Isauro Félix Corona, 1992–1994
 Gonzalo Aguirre Enrile, 1994
 Carlos Virgilio Ferrer Argote, 1994–1996
 Carlos Ignacio Gónzalez Magallón, 1996–1999
 Carlos Alejandro Rodríguez y Quezada, 2000–2004
 Eduardo Héctor Moguel Flores, 2005–2009
 Mercedes Felicitas Ruiz Zapata, 2009–2014
 José Evaristo Ramón Xilotl Ramírez, 2014–2016
 José Humberto Castro Villalobos, 2016-2021
 Carlos Isauro Félix Corona, 2021-Present

See also
 Mexico–Serbia relations
 Mexico–Yugoslavia relations

References
Embassy of Mexico in Belgrade
 

Serbia
Mexico–Serbia relations
Mexico